Ernie Roe (1919 – 2007) was a British weightlifter. He competed in the men's light-heavyweight event at the 1948 Summer Olympics.

References

1919 births
2007 deaths
British male weightlifters
Olympic weightlifters of Great Britain
Weightlifters at the 1948 Summer Olympics
Place of birth missing
20th-century British people